Steven Vincent Buscemi (born December 13, 1957) is an American actor. He is known for his roles in Quentin Tarantino's Reservoir Dogs (1992), Robert Rodriguez's Desperado (1995), Simon West's Con Air (1997), Michael Bay's Armageddon (1998), the dark comedy Ghost World (2001), Tim Burton's drama Big Fish (2003), and Armando Iannucci's political satire The Death of Stalin (2017). Buscemi is also known for his many collaborations with the Coen brothers, having appeared in six of their films: Miller's Crossing (1990), Barton Fink (1991), The Hudsucker Proxy (1994), Fargo (1996), The Big Lebowski (1998), and Paris, je t'aime (2006).

Buscemi has also had a prolific career in television. From 2010 to 2014, Buscemi starred in the lead role as Enoch "Nucky" Thompson in the critically acclaimed HBO television series Boardwalk Empire created by Terence Winter. His performance earned him two Screen Actors Guild Awards, a Golden Globe and two nominations for an Emmy Award. His other television roles include The Sopranos (2004, 2006), 30 Rock (2007–2013), Portlandia (2014–2017) and Miracle Workers (2019–present). Buscemi starred in a leading role in comedian Louis C.K.'s tragicomedy web series Horace and Pete (2016). He made his directorial film debut with Trees Lounge (1996), which he also wrote and starred in. Following this, he directed Animal Factory (2000), Lonesome Jim (2004), and Interview (2007).

Buscemi has worked prominently in animation, including voice-work for Randall Boggs in the Monsters, Inc. film franchise (2001–2013), Wesley in Home on the Range (2004), Horace Nebbercracker in Monster House (2006), Templeton the Rat in Charlotte's Web (2006), Scamper in Igor (2008), Bucky the Hamster in G-Force (2009), Wayne the Werewolf in the Hotel Transylvania film franchise (2012–2022) and Francis E. Francis in The Boss Baby (2017).

Multiple film critics and media outlets have cited Buscemi as one of the best actors never to have received an Academy Award nomination.

Early life 
Steven Vincent Buscemi was born on December 13, 1957, in the borough of Brooklyn in New York City, to Dorothy (Wilson) and John Buscemi. His father was a sanitation worker and served in the Korean War, and his mother was a hostess at Howard Johnson's. Buscemi's paternal ancestors were from the town of Menfi in Sicily, and his mother is of Irish, English, and Dutch ancestry. He has three brothers: Jon, Ken and Michael. Michael is also an actor. Buscemi was raised Catholic.

When Buscemi was 10 years old, the family moved from East New York to Valley Stream in Nassau County. Buscemi graduated in 1975 from Valley Stream Central High School along with future writer Edward J. Renehan, Jr. and future actress Patricia Charbonneau. In high school, Buscemi wrestled for the varsity squad and participated in the drama troupe. (Buscemi's 1996 film Trees Lounge, in which he starred and served as screenwriter and director, is set in and was largely shot in his childhood village of Valley Stream.) Buscemi briefly attended Nassau Community College before moving to Manhattan to enroll in the Lee Strasberg Institute.

Career

1980s: Early work
Buscemi made his acting debut in the 1985 film The Way It Is, directed by Eric Mitchell, which was part of the no wave cinema movement. Other early performances include Parting Glances (1986) as well as an appearance in an episode of the television series Miami Vice in 1986.

In 1989, he appeared in four films, including James Ivory's comedy Slaves of New York, Howard Brookner's ensemble period film Bloodhounds of Broadway and the New York Stories segment directed by Martin Scorsese entitled, "Life Lessons" starring alongside Nick Nolte and Rosanna Arquette. The film screened out of competition at the 1989 Cannes Film Festival to mixed reviews with the Scorsese segment being hailed as the standout by Roger Ebert. Buscemi also appeared in Jim Jarmusch's independent film Mystery Train (1989) as Charlie the Barber, and was nominated for the Independent Spirit Award for Best Supporting Male.

1990s: Breakthrough 
In 1990, he played Mink in the Coen Brothers' neo-noir gangster film Millers Crossing starring opposite Gabriel Byrne, Marcia Gay Harden, and John Turturro. This was the first of five of the Coen Brothers' films in which Buscemi performed. Critic Roger Ebert described the film as one that "It is likely to be most appreciated by movie lovers who will enjoy its resonance with films of the past."

Also that year, he starred as  Test Tube, a henchman of Laurence Fishburne's character Jimmy Jump in Abel Ferrara's crime film King of New York, as well as Edward in the anthology film Tales from the Darkside: The Movie, the protagonist of the "Lot 249" segment of the film.

In 1991, he played a bellboy, Chet, in the Coen Brothers film black comedy Barton Fink starring John Turturro and John Goodman. His first lead role was as Adolpho Rollo in Alexandre Rockwell's In the Soup (1992). He gained wider attention for his supporting part as pseudonymous criminal Mr. Pink in Quentin Tarantino's crime film Reservoir Dogs (1992), a role that Tarantino originally wrote for himself, and one that earned Buscemi the Independent Spirit Award for Best Supporting Male in his second nomination. Also in 1992, he had a guest role as Phil Hickle, Ellen's father and older Pete's guidance counselor, in The Adventures of Pete and Pete. The following year, he starred as the eponymous character in the critically panned horror comedy film Ed and His Dead Mother. He also appeared in a cameo appearance in Tarantino's next film, Pulp Fiction, where he portrays a waiter dressed as Buddy Holly who serves Mia Wallace and Vincent Vega. He endeared himself to comedy fans as Rex, bass player of The Lone Rangers, in the 1994 comedy Airheads.  In 1995, Buscemi guest-starred as suspected murderer Gordon Pratt in "End Game", an episode of the television series Homicide: Life on the Street. Buscemi was rumored to be considered for the role of The Scarecrow in Joel Schumacher's proposed fifth installment of the first Batman franchise, Batman Unchained, before Warner Bros. cancelled the project.

The next year, Buscemi again collaborated with the Coen Brothers, starring as kidnapper Carl Showalter in the black comedy crime film Fargo starring Frances McDormand and William H. Macy. The film was a critical and commercial success debuting at the 1996 Cannes Film Festival where it competed for the Palme d'Or. Subsequently, he gained a reputation as character actor, with supporting roles in the blockbuster action films as Garland Greene in Simon West's Con Air (1997) and Rockhound in Michael Bay's Armageddon (1998). Buscemi also appeared as Donny in the Coen's cult classic black comedy film The Big Lebowski (1998).

2000s: Franchises 
Going into the 2000s, Buscemi continued to co-star in supporting roles. He played Seymour in Ghost World (2001) and Romero in Spy Kids 2: The Island of Lost Dreams (2002), as well as its sequel Spy Kids 3-D: Game Over (2003). He also extensively performed voice-over work for animated films, playing Randall Boggs in Monsters, Inc. (2001), a role he later reprised in its prequel Monsters University (2013), Mr. Wesley in Home on the Range (2004), Nebbercracker in Monster House (2006) and Templeton the Rat in Charlotte's Web.

In 2004, Buscemi joined the cast of the television series The Sopranos as Tony Soprano's cousin and childhood friend, Tony Blundetto, a role that earned him an Emmy Award nomination. Buscemi had previously contributed to the show as director of the third-season episode "Pine Barrens", which was one of the most critically acclaimed episodes of the series, and the fourth-season episode "Everybody Hurts". He appeared in episode three of season 6 as a doorman in the afterlife, which is portrayed as a country club in Tony Soprano's dream. He also directed the episodes "In Camelot", the seventh episode of season 5, and "Mr. & Mrs. John Sacrimoni Request...", the fifth episode of season 6. As well, he appeared in the music video for Joe Strummer's cover version of Bob Marley's "Redemption Song".

2010s: Boardwalk Empire 
Buscemi starred in the HBO drama series Boardwalk Empire created by Terence Winter. The series started in 2010, where Buscemi assumed the role as Enoch "Nucky" Thompson (based on Enoch L. Johnson), a corrupt Atlantic City politician who rules the town during the Prohibition era. Buscemi's performance garnered him a Golden Globe Award for Best Actor – Television Series Drama; he later received two more nominations for his work on the same show. In 2011 he hosted NBC's Saturday Night Live.

He hosts, directs, and produces his own web series talk show, Park Bench with Steve Buscemi, which debuted in May 2014. Buscemi won the Primetime Emmy Award for Outstanding Short Form Variety Series for the series in 2016. In January 2016, Buscemi began co-starring alongside Louis C.K. and Alan Alda in C.K.'s acclaimed comedy-drama web series Horace and Pete. In an interview with The Hollywood Reporter, Buscemi was the first actor to sign on to the project; with Boardwalk Empire over he was available to star in the series. The two reportedly "met up in New York City where C.K. pitched the still evolving series idea to Buscemi. He signed on, on the spot, to play C.K.’s brother, Pete".

In 2017 Buscemi starred in Armando Iannucci's dark comedy and satirical film The Death of Stalin. Buscemi portrayed Nikita Khrushchev. He received critical acclaim from critics with Manohla Dargis describing his performance as "superb". The performance earned him a British Independent Film Award nomination for Best Supporting Actor.

2020s: Continued work 
In February 2020, Buscemi was cast as Chebutykin in a New York Theatre Workshop revival of Anton Chekov's Three Sisters alongside Greta Gerwig, Oscar Isaac, and Chris Messina. The production was supposed to begin May 13, but was cancelled due to the COVID-19 pandemic with no return date set.

Directing 
Buscemi has also worked as a director, making his directing debut in the 1990s. His directorial credits include:
 What Happened to Pete (1992) (short film)
 Trees Lounge (1996)
 Animal Factory (2000)
 Lonesome Jim (2005)
 Interview (2007)
 The Listener (2022)

In addition to feature films, he directed episodes of the television shows Love, Homicide: Life on the Street, The Sopranos, Oz, 30 Rock, Portlandia, and Nurse Jackie. In the latter, his brother Michael played the character God in several episodes. While scouting a location for a film, Buscemi visited the Philadelphia Eastern State Penitentiary and found the building so interesting that he later provided the majority of the narration for the audio tour there.

Reception and image 
In an interview with The Hollywood Reporter, Buscemi was adamant about not altering his misaligned teeth, saying, "I've had dentists who have wanted to help me out, but I say, 'You know, I won't work again if you fix my teeth. Buscemi is noted for wrinkles around his eyes, giving them an aged appearance. "Buscemi eyes" describes the result when his eyes are photo-edited onto others' faces. He has stated that although he did not find this amusing, his wife Jo Andres did.

Buscemi guest-starred in season 6 episode 7 of 30 Rock as a private investigator. Playing against his image, during a flashback he appears to be disguised as a teenager as he says that he was "part of a special task force of very young-looking cops who infiltrated high schools". His character's disguise became an internet meme.

The 1999 hit song "Hey Leonardo" referenced Buscemi as "that guy who played in Fargo…I think his name is Steve.”

Personal life 
He once remarked, "I had to go to Sicily to find out I pronounce my name wrong."

Buscemi was a New York City firefighter from 1980 to 1984, with Engine Company No. 55, in the Little Italy section of New York. The day after the September 11 attacks in New York, he returned to his old firehouse to  volunteer; he worked twelve-hour shifts for a week, and dug through rubble looking for missing firefighters. On May 25, 2003, Buscemi was arrested with nineteen other people while protesting the closing of a number of firehouses, including Engine 55.

Buscemi married Jo Andres in 1987; they were married until her death on 6 January 2019.  They had one son, Lucian (born 1990).

In April 2001 while in Wilmington, North Carolina, shooting the film Domestic Disturbance Buscemi was stabbed multiple times after intervening in a bar fight between Vince Vaughn, Scott Rosenberg, and two local men. He was released from hospital after treatment.

As a guest in episode 13 of the genealogy series Who Do You Think You Are?, he traced his maternal ancestry to Julia Vanderhoof and Ralph B. Montgomery (1834–1878), individuals of Dutch and English descent, respectively. The program aired on March 25, 2011.

In the middle of 2011, he joined rallies against the threat of the closing of eight Brooklyn firehouses during the administration of Mayor Michael Bloomberg, saying "Closing [these firehouses] is no way to protect New York."

In 2014, Buscemi starred in and narrated the HBO documentary A Good Job: Stories of the FDNY, in which he revisited his work with fellow firefighters. He shares their stories, including those from September 11.

Buscemi is a noted fan of the musical group Beastie Boys. Along with several other stars, he appears in the music video for the band's 2011 song "Make Some Noise", which was nominated for MTV Video of the Year. He also has a post-credit scene in the Spike Jonze–directed documentary Beastie Boys Story in which he pokes fun at the commercial failure of the group's second studio album, Paul's Boutique; "When the tree fell in the forest, nobody heard that shit," jokes Buscemi. Buscemi sang in "The Broadway Song" for Lou Reed's 2003 album The Raven.

Buscemi currently resides in Park Slope, Brooklyn, where he was given  the key to the city in 2021. He previously resided in Sunset Strip, Los Angeles.

Filmography 

Buscemi has an extensive body of work in both film and television dating back to the 1980s.

Awards and honors

Buscemi has received numerous awards and nominations for his performances in film and television.  This includes a Golden Globe Award for Best Supporting Actor – Motion Picture nomination for his performance in Ghost World (2003). He also received five Independent Spirit Award nominations winning twice for Best Supporting Male for his roles in Reservoir Dogs (1992), and Ghost World (2003). For his role as Enoch 'Nucky' Thompson in the critically acclaimed HBO drama series created by Martin Scorsese, he received two Primetime Emmy Award nominations, three Golden Globe Award nominations, and ten Screen Actors Guild Award (SAG) nominations. He received a Golden Globe Award for Best Actor – Television Series Drama in 2011, and four SAG awards, two consecutive Outstanding Actor in a Drama Series awards (2011, 2012), and two consecutive Outstanding Ensemble in a Comedy Series (2011, 2012). Buscemi won a Primetime Emmy Award for Outstanding Short Form Variety Series for Park Bench with Steve Buscemi (2016).

In 2014, Buscemi was named Honorary Battalion Chief by the New York City Fire Department after his early career serving as a fireman, and for his return to the service during 9/11. He worked 12 hour shifts for several days alongside other firefighters, searching for survivors in the rubble from the World Trade Center.

Notes

References

External links 

 
 

1957 births
Living people
20th-century American male actors
21st-century American male actors
American people of Italian descent
American male film actors
American male stage actors
American male television actors
American male voice actors
American people of Dutch descent
American people of English descent
American people of Irish descent
American television directors
Best Drama Actor Golden Globe (television) winners
Film directors from New York City
Film producers from New York (state)
Independent Spirit Award for Best Supporting Male winners
Lee Strasberg Theatre and Film Institute alumni
Male actors from New York City
Nassau Community College alumni
New York City firefighters
Outstanding Performance by a Male Actor in a Drama Series Screen Actors Guild Award winners
People associated with the September 11 attacks
People from Brooklyn
People from Valley Stream, New York
People of Sicilian descent
Primetime Emmy Award winners
Valley Stream Central High School alumni